Cristian Raúl Ledesma (born 29 December 1978 in San Isidro) is a former Argentine footballer. He is nicknamed Lobo ("Wolf"). He was most recently the head coach of Club Atlético Tigre.

Playing career

Club

Ledesma began his professional footballing career with Argentinos Juniors in 1997. He then played for River Plate, Hamburger SV in Germany, Monterrey in Mexico, Colón and Racing Club.

After winning the Argentinian league with San Lorenzo, Ledesma was signed by the Greek champions Olympiacos, for roughly €1,800,000 giving him an opportunity to play in the Greek league and the UEFA Champions League. After one year with Olympiacos, he was loaned back to San Lorenzo for one season in August 2008.

On 13 July 2010, Ledesma returned to Colón on a free transfer.

International
He made his national team debut against Chile, 18 April 2007. He was called up to a friendly against Norway on 22 August 2007. He made his third appearance for Argentina against Australia on 11 September.

Coaching career

Tigre
On 18 December 2017, Ledesma was appointed as the head coach of Club Atlético Tigre.

Honours

Club
River Plate
Argentine Primera División: Apertura 1999, Clausura 2000, Clausura 2002, Final 2013–14

Hamburger SV
DFB-Ligapokal: 2003

San Lorenzo
Argentine Primera División: Clausura 2007

Olympiacos
Greek Super Cup: 2007
Super League Greece: 2007–08
Greek Football Cup: 2007–08

References

External links
 
 Cristian Ledesma at Football Lineups
 
 
 Argentine Primera statistics at Fútbol XXI 

1978 births
Living people
People from San Isidro, Buenos Aires
Argentine footballers
Argentina international footballers
Argentine Primera División players
Argentinos Juniors footballers
Club Atlético River Plate footballers
Argentine expatriate footballers
Expatriate footballers in Germany
Bundesliga players
Hamburger SV players
Expatriate footballers in Mexico
C.F. Monterrey players
Club Atlético Colón footballers
Racing Club de Avellaneda footballers
San Lorenzo de Almagro footballers
Expatriate footballers in Greece
Super League Greece players
Olympiacos F.C. players
Association football midfielders
Argentine expatriate sportspeople in Germany
Argentine expatriate sportspeople in Greece
Argentine expatriate sportspeople in Mexico
Sportspeople from Buenos Aires Province